The Annals of Allergy, Asthma, & Immunology is a monthly peer-reviewed medical journal covering allergy, asthma, and immunology. The journal was established in 1943 under the name Annals of Allergy, obtaining its current name in 1995. The journal is published by Elsevier on behalf of the American College of Allergy, Asthma and Immunology, of which it is the official journal. The editor-in-chief is Mitchell H. Grayson, MD (Nationwide Children's Hospital and The Ohio State University). According to the journal's website, the journal has a 2021 impact factor of 6.248.

References

External links

Immunology journals
Publications established in 1943
Elsevier academic journals
Monthly journals
English-language journals
Academic journals associated with learned and professional societies